Albert Phil(l)ips may refer to:

Buz Phillips (Albert Abernathy Phillips, 1904–1964), Major League Baseball pitcher
Albert L. Phillips (1824–1893), Wisconsin politician
 Al Phillips (1920–1999), English boxer
Albert Phillips (politician); see Political party strength in Connecticut

See also
Bert Phillips (disambiguation)